Malaysia competed in the 1975 Southeast Asian Peninsular Games held in Bangkok, Thailand from 9 to 16 December 1975.

Medal summary

Medals by sport

Medallists

References

1975